The 2015 FIVB Men's World Cup was held from 8 to 23 September 2015 in Japan. The tournament served as a qualification process for the 2016 Summer Olympics in Rio de Janeiro, Brazil. The top two teams, USA and Italy, qualified for the Olympics, and joined Brazil as they had already secured a berth as the host country.

United States secured the country's second title with 10 victories and only 1 loss. Matt Anderson was elected the Most Valuable Player. Moreover, there were 3 record breakings. Firstly, Thomas Edgar broke the highest score points in a single match record in Australia's win over Egypt with 50 points. Secondly, in Canada's win over Australia in five sets (32–34, 25–14, 25–21, 27–29, 20–18), two tournament records were broken: the longest match (2 hours and 49 minutes) and the highest scoring game (245 points).

Information
The FIVB Volleyball World Cup began with signing a contract between Fédération Internationale de Volleyball (FIVB) and Japan Volleyball Association (JVA) for hosting the tournament on 31 January 2013. In this event, Fuji TV had the right to broadcast the tournament. Moreover, the FIVB released the qualification process of the tournament:

 Host country
 2014 World champions
 2 teams per continental confederation considered by World ranking, continental ranking, or continental championship
But, on 10 March 2015, the FIVB announced a change of the continental events following each continental confederation's agreement.
 AVC used the World ranking as of 1 January 2015.
 CAVB used the African Championship.
 CEV used the European ranking as of 1 January 2015.
 CSV held a qualification tournament.
 NORCECA used the 2015 NORCECA Champions Cup.

Changes

 Olympics places  Only the winners and runners-up of the competition could secure the berths in the 2016 Summer Olympics. It was different from last edition which three medalists teams joined the Olympics.
 Qualification format  The 2015 World Cup changed the format of the competition following the information above. There were not 2 wild card teams like 2011 edition. One of these spots belonged to the World champions, the other one belonged to the 2nd place of a continental event (2011 edition gave tickets to 4 of 5 continents, but 2015 edition gave tickets to all 5 continents).
 Competition format  Competition rounds decreased from 4 in 2011 to 3. Combining rounds 1 (3 days) and 2 (2 days) in 2011 to 1 round of 5 days. The hosts also reduced the venues from 8 to 6.
 Pool standing procedure  In 2011 edition, match points was the first criterion, but 2015 changed it to number of matches won. All criteria are shown in section Pool standing procedure. 
 Net touch  In this edition, players can not touch the whole net and antennas, not just the white band like in 2011 edition.
 Roster  All 14 players (maximum 12 regular players and maximum 2 liberos) can play in every match and be named in score sheets.
 Individual awards  Individual awards were given to players by positions, unlike previous editions when awards were given to players by volleyball skills.
 Attribution of points FIVB approved the proposal that in case the team hosting the Summer Olympics participated in a previous World Cup then they would keep the World Ranking points gained at the previous World Cup.
 Referee  It was the first time in the competition when there was a challenge referee. In each match, there was a referee who controlled the challenge system.

Qualification
12 teams participated in the World Cup. Only teams who had not yet qualified for the 2016 Summer Olympics could compete in the tournament.

Squads
Maximum of 12 regular players and maximum of 2 liberos can be selected to play in the tournament. The rosters of 14 players of each team can be seen in the article below.

Venues

Format

The competition system of the 2015 World Cup for men was the single Round-Robin system. Each team played once against each of the 11 remaining teams.

The teams were divided into 2 pools of 6 teams each. In round 1, total 30 matches in 5 days, each teams played against the other teams from the same pool. For rounds 2 and 3, total 36 matches in 6 days, each team played against the teams from another pool.

The pools composition followed the Serpentine system based on the FIVB World Ranking where the host team was at the top position. There were no teams from CAVB on the drawing of lots day, the teams from CAVB were at the bottom position of pool composition. Numbers in brackets denoted the FIVB World Ranking as of 22 September 2014 except the hosts who ranked 21st.

Pool standing procedure
 Match points
 Number of matches won
 Sets ratio
 Points ratio
 Result of the last match between the tied teams

Match won 3–0 or 3–1: 3 match points for the winner, 0 match points for the loser 
Match won 3–2: 2 match points for the winner, 1 match point for the loser

Results

All times are Japan Standard Time (UTC+09:00).

First round

Site A

Site B

Second round

Site A

Site B

Third round

Site A

Site B

Final standing

Awards

 Most Valuable Player
  Matt Anderson
 Best Setter
  Micah Christenson
 Best Outside Spikers
  Osmany Juantorena
  Yūki Ishikawa
 Best Middle Blockers
  Sebastián Sole
  Mohammad Mousavi
 Best Opposite Spiker
  Ivan Zaytsev
 Best Libero
  Erik Shoji

Statistics leaders

References

External links
 Official website
 Final standing
 Awards
 Statistics

2015 Men
FIVB World Cup Men
FIVB Volleyball Men's World Cup
FIVB Volleyball Men's World Cup
International volleyball competitions hosted by Japan
Volleyball qualification for the 2016 Summer Olympics